Sister Nibedita Government General Degree College for Girls, Hastings House, is the first government girls' degree college in West Bengal to be established after independence. It is named after Sister Nivedita in the heritage campus of Hastings House, the erstwhile residence of the first Governor General of India. This college is affiliated to University of Calcutta and recognized under Section 2(f) of UGC Act.

Academics
The college offers undergraduate honours and pass courses:

Activities
 NSS
 Sports
 Cultural programme
 Seminars
 Publications

Facilities
 Library
 Canteen
 Computer Room
 Student Common Room
 Smart Class
 WiFi Campus
 Sick Room
 Grievance Redressal Cell
 Career Counseling
 Anti Ragging 
 Fellowships

External links 
 College Website
 WB Higher Education
 University of Calcutta

References 

Universities and colleges in Kolkata
Women's universities and colleges in West Bengal
University of Calcutta affiliates
Educational institutions established in 2015
2015 establishments in West Bengal